Blondes for Danger  is a 1938 British thriller film directed by Jack Raymond and starring Gordon Harker and Enid Stamp-Taylor. It was made at Beaconsfield Studios for release by British Lion. The film's sets were designed by the art director Norman G. Arnold.

Premise
London cabbie Alf Huggins finds himself caught up in the world of espionage and assassination. When a British executive's monopoly of the oil industry is threatened, Alf is set up as the patsy for his attempt on a Middle-Eastern Prince's life.

Cast
 Gordon Harker as Alf Huggins  
 Enid Stamp-Taylor as Valerie  
 Janet Johnson as Ann Penny  
 Ivan Brandt as Captain Berkeley  
 Percy Parsons as Quentin Hearns  
 Everley Gregg as Hetty Hopper  
 Henry Wolston as Doctor  
 Charles Eaton as Prince Boris

Critical reception
TV Guide wrote, "nicely done suspense tale of international intrigue sparked with generous doses of comedy from the witty Harker"; and Sky Movies noted, "Comedy-thrillers with droop-lipped cockney character star Gordon Harker were pure gold at the box-office in Britain of the late Thirties," and went on to call the film "a robust romp."

References

Bibliography
 Low, Rachael. Filmmaking in 1930s Britain. George Allen & Unwin, 1985.
 Wood, Linda. British Films, 1927-1939. British Film Institute, 1986.

External links

1938 films
British thriller films
1930s thriller films
Films shot at Beaconsfield Studios
Films set in London
Films directed by Jack Raymond
British black-and-white films
1930s English-language films
1930s British films